Henry Finch may also refer to:

Henry Finch (died 1625), English lawyer and politician, MP for Canterbury, and for St Albans
Henry Finch (died 1761) (1694–1761), British academic and politician, MP for Malton
Henry Finch (priest) (1633–1704), English ejected minister
Henry Finch (cricketer) (1842–1935), English cricketer and barrister
Henry LeRoy Finch, American film director
Henry Leroy Finch Jr. (born 1918), American scholar, professor of philosophy and pacifist organizer

See also
Henry Finch-Hatton, 13th Earl of Winchilsea (1852–1927), English peer
Harry Finch (1907–1949), Australian rugby league player